Alexandros Abdel Rahim (born 23 September 1993) is a Greek professional footballer who plays as a winger.

Club career

Abdel Rahim started his career with Greek lower league side Olympiakos Laurium after playing for the youth academy of AEK (Athens), one of the most successful clubs in Greece.

In 2018, Abdel Rahim signed for Kastrioti in the Albanian top flight after playing for Greek fourth division team Pelopas Kiato, where he made 3 league appearances and scored 0 goals. On 18 August 2018, Abdel Rahim made his league debut for Kastrioti during a 1–0 win over Luftëtari (Gjirokastër).

Before the second half of 2020/21, he signed for Skënderbeu in the Albanian top flight after playing for  Greek fourth division outfit Kifisia.

International career

Abdel Rahim is eligible to represent Sudan internationally through his father.

References

External links
 
 
 Alexandros Abdel Rahim at playmakerstats.com

Greek people of Sudanese descent
Greek expatriate footballers
Kategoria Superiore players
Expatriate footballers in Albania
Greek expatriates in Albania
KF Skënderbeu Korçë players
KS Kastrioti players
1993 births
Living people
Acharnaikos F.C. players
Gamma Ethniki players
Association football wingers
Footballers from Athens
Greek men's footballers